Linnea Mellgren (born 17 May 1989) is a Swedish former competitive figure skater. She is the 2015 Golden Bear of Zagreb champion, the 2011 Ice Challenge bronze medalist, a two-time (2009, 2011) Nordic silver medalist, and the 2009 Swedish national silver medalist.

Programs

Competitive highlights 
JGP: Junior Grand Prix

References

External links
 
 Linnea Mellgren at Tracings.net

1989 births
Swedish female single skaters
Living people
People from Enköping
Competitors at the 2015 Winter Universiade
Competitors at the 2011 Winter Universiade
Competitors at the 2009 Winter Universiade
Sportspeople from Uppsala County
21st-century Swedish women